

Beast People 

The Beast People (also called Beastmen or Beastkin) are one of the race of people inhabiting the New World.

Trivia 

 The trading card has the Emerald Attack Power trait.
 There are two movie references in the titles used on the card:
 Firstly, the mini-heading "Scarface" on the front is likely a reference to the 1983 crime film of the same name.
 The title for the illustration on the back, "Dr. Evil", is most likely a reference to the Austin Powers franchise villain of the same name.

Anaspida genera
Devonian jawless fish
Late Devonian fish
Fossils of Canada